Sultan Omar Ali Saifuddien College, abbreviated as , is a government boys' secondary school in Bandar Seri Begawan, the capital of Brunei. It is the first secondary school in the country. The school is also one of the only three boys' secondary schools nationwide, with the other two being Muda Hashim Secondary School and Ma'had Islam Brunei. The school provides five years of secondary education leading up to GCE 'O' Level and IGCSE qualification.

Name 
The school is named after Sultan Omar 'Ali Saifuddien III, the twenty-eighth Sultan of Brunei, who preceded the current Sultan of Brunei, Sultan Hassanal Bolkiah.

History 
Sultan Omar Ali Saifuddien College was established on 15 October 1951. At the time of the establishment, it was known as Brunei Town Government English School and functioned as an English preparatory school. It was also the first government school in the country which provided education in English. The school eventually renamed to its that as it is known today in 1955.

The school was the first to provide secondary education in the country. It was gradually implemented, beginning in 1953 with the introduction of Form I. By 1957, the school had all five years of the secondary education and for the first time the Cambridge Overseas School Certificate examination, a precursor to GCE 'O' Level, was conducted at the school in that year for its Form V students.

The British writer Anthony Burgess taught at the school in 1959.

Academics 
At present, secondary education in Sultan Omar Ali Saifuddien College lasts five years, beginning in Year 7. At the end of Year 11, students sit for GCE 'O' Level and/or IGCSE examination. After that, they may proceed to sixth form for A Levels. Alternatively, they may also opt for vocational education at IBTE schools or other types of post-secondary education at various non-government schools.

Notable alumni 
 Sultan Hassanal Bolkiah, the current Sultan of Brunei
 Abu Bakar Apong, politician of Brunei
 Abdul Rahman Ibrahim, politician of Brunei

See also 
 List of secondary schools in Brunei

References 

Secondary schools in Brunei
Cambridge schools in Brunei